Michael Padrolo was a Roman Catholic prelate who served as Bishop of Nemosia (1443–?).

Biography
Michael Padrolo was ordained a bishop in the Order of Preachers and appointed during the papacy of Pope Eugene IV as Bishop of Nemosia. On 17 November 1443, he was consecrated bishop by Radulphus, Bishop of Città di Castello, with Luis de La Guerra, Bishop of Guarda, and Benedetto Paconati, Bishop of Bagnoregio, serving as co-consecrators.

References 

15th-century Roman Catholic bishops in Cyprus
Bishops appointed by Pope Eugene IV
Dominican bishops